Jeff Hughes (born August 20, 1984 in Covington, Kentucky) is an American professional soccer player.

Career

Youth and college
Growing up in Northern Kentucky, Hughes set several area records for goals scored while playing at Holmes High School. During his senior season, he set the Region record for goals scored in a season and was voted 2001 Northern Kentucky Player of the Year. After high school Hughes chose to play soccer for NCAA Division I Western Michigan University, and then later transferred to the University of Cincinnati at the end of his sophomore year.

Professional
Hughes left the college ranks after just one season with the UC Bearcats, forfeiting his remaining NCAA eligibility to play professionally. Originally he signed with the Second Bundesliga club TSV 1860 München, but soon after, he returned to the US and found a home with the USL Second Division team Cincinnati Kings. During the 2006 season, the Kings traded Hughes to the North Carolina-based Wilmington Hammerheads.  After just over a year with Wilmington, he left to join the Pittsburgh Riverhounds for the 2008 season.

After the close of the 2008 season, he signed with 1790 Cincinnati in the Professional Arena Soccer League, where he was named 2nd team PASL. He returned to the Riverhounds for 2009, but was released from his contract at the end of the season.

Having been unable to secure a professional contract elsewhere, Hughes returned to play for the Cincinnati Kings in the USL Premier Development League in 2010.

Jeff signed for the Major Indoor Soccer League club, the Syracuse Silver Knights in 2011.

Hughes signed on to be a midfielder and the head coach of the Cincinnati Kings of the Professional Arena Soccer League for the 2012–13 season. Although he led the Kings to qualify for the postseason and was the team's leading scorer, he was released on January 25, 2013. Hughes signed with the Missouri Comets of the Major Indoor Soccer League the same day.

References

External links
 Riverhounds bio

1984 births
Living people
American soccer players
Cincinnati Bearcats men's soccer players
TSV 1860 Munich II players
Cincinnati Kings players
Pittsburgh Riverhounds SC players
Professional Arena Soccer League coaches
Professional Arena Soccer League players
Syracuse Silver Knights players
USL Second Division players
USL League Two players
Wilmington Hammerheads FC players
Missouri Comets players
Major Indoor Soccer League (2008–2014) players
Soccer players from Kentucky
Association football forwards
Major Arena Soccer League players
San Diego Sockers players
Ontario Fury players
Player-coaches